Mediocre Generica is the debut studio album by the American punk band Leftöver Crack. It was released on September 11, 2001 and includes much sociopolitical commentary, including anti-police sentiment, anti-racism and anti-homophobia. The album was originally intended to be titled Shoot the Kids at School, which Hellcat Records objected to. As Stza said in an interview, "They wanted mediocre generic artwork and they wanted a mediocre generic title, so I called it Mediocre Generica and I guarantee you the irony was lost on Epitaph".  This has been cited as one of the main reasons that Leftöver Crack made the move to the much smaller label Alternative Tentacles.  The album was coincidentally released on the same day as the September 11 terrorist attacks, and during the introduction on the band's next release, Fuck World Trade, this album is referred to as "the tower-toppling Mediocre Generica".

Track listing

Personnel

Scott Sturgeon - vocals, producer
Ezra Kire - additional vocals, guitar
Alec Baillie - bass
Ara Babajian - drums
Pezent Shayne Webb - piano
Deston Berry - Hammond organ
Hilary Allen - Hammond organ
Lady Jericha - Wurlitzer organ
John Dolan - harmonica (track 13)
Christopher LaSalle - trumpet (track 13)
Kenny Lienhardt - engineer
Mike Trujillo - engineer
Kevin Bartley - mastering
Seth Oleneck - photography
Lorien Babajian - layout
Joel "Rage" Garcia - additional layout

Release history

References

External links 
 
 

2001 albums
Leftöver Crack albums
Hellcat Records albums